Abdoullah Bamoussa (born 8 June 1986) is an Italian born Moroccan steeplechase runner, 8th at the 2016 European Athletics Championships.

Biography
He competed at the 2016 Summer Olympics in the men's 3000 metres steeplechase race; his time of 8:42.81 in the heats did not qualify him for the final.

Personal best
3000 m steeplechase: 8:22.00 -  Rome, 8 June 2017 (Golden Gala)

Achievements

See also
Italy at the 2017 World Championships in Athletics
Naturalized athletes of Italy

References

External links
 

1986 births
Living people
Italian male steeplechase runners
Olympic athletes of Italy
Athletes (track and field) at the 2016 Summer Olympics
World Athletics Championships athletes for Italy